Stine Andersen (born 25 March 1993) is a Danish handball player who plays for Viborg HK and the Danish national team.

International honours
EHF Cup Winners' Cup:
Winner: 2016  
EHF Cup:
Winner: 2015

References

1993 births
Living people
People from Odense Municipality
Danish female handball players
Sportspeople from the Region of Southern Denmark